Tantulocarida is a highly specialised group of parasitic crustaceans that consists of about 33 species, treated as a class  in superclass Multicrustacea. They are typically ectoparasites that infest copepods, isopods, tanaids, amphipods and ostracods.

Description

Eyes are completely absent.

Body length
One tantulocarid species, Tantulacus dieteri, is the world's smallest arthropod, with a total body length of only .

Life cycle

The tantulocarid life cycle is unique among crustaceans. The tantulus larva transforms directly from a non-feeding (lecithotrophic) and free-swimming organism into a parasite without any instars. When entering the parasitic stage much of the body, such as the muscles, degenerates, even if the body itself becomes bigger. As a parasite it is permanently attached to its host, and after piercing its host's cuticle with an unpaired stylet, a rootlet system used to absorb nutrients enters through the hole and grow into the host’s tissue. The adult form devlopes inside the larva, and can become either a sac-like parthenogenetic female, or a fully developed free-living, non-feeding and sexually-reproducing male or female. The eggs inside the parthenogenetic female are eventually released as fully developed tantulus larvae. The finding of what appears to be a benthic non-feeding nauplius larva suggests that eggs produced by sexual females hatch as nauplii instead of tantulus larvae. Both the parthenogenetic and sexual females are semelparous.

Classification
Five families are recognised:

Basipodellidae Boxshall & Lincoln, 1983:
Basipodella Becker, 1975
Hypertantulus Ohtsuka & Boxshall, 1998
Nipponotantulus Huys, Ohtsuka & Boxshall, 1994
Polynyapodella Huys, Møberg & Kristensen, 1997
Rimitantulus Huys & Conroy-Dalton, 1997
Serratotantulus Savchenko & Kolbasov, 2009
Stygotantulus Boxshall & Huys, 1989

Doryphallophoridae Huys, 1991:
Doryphallophora Huys, 1990
Paradoryphallophora Ohtsuka & Boxshall, 1998

Microdajidae Boxshall & Lincoln, 1987:
Microdajus Greve, 1965
Xenalytus Huys, 1991

Cumoniscidae Nierstrasz & Brender à Brandis, 1923 (formerly family Deoterthridae:
Amphitantulus Boxshall & Vader, 1993
Aphotocentor Huys, 1991
Arcticotantulus Kornev, Tchesunov & Rybnikov, 2004
Boreotantulus Huys & Boxshall, 1988
Campyloxiphos Huys, 1991
Coralliotantulus Huys, 1991
Cumoniscus Bonnier, 1903
Deoterthron Bradford & Hewitt, 1980
Dicrotrichura Huys, 1989
Itoitantulus Huys, Ohtsuka Boxshall & Itô, 1992
Tantulacus Huys, Andersen & Kristensen, 1992
Onceroxenidae Huys, 1991:
Onceroxenus Boxshall & Lincoln, 1987

References

External links

Maxillopoda
Parasitic crustaceans
Arthropod subclasses